Caater is an Estonian Eurodance duo of Kalle Kukk and Markku Tiidumaa. Caater is signed with Sony Music.

In 1999, Caater was awarded the "Kuldne Plaat" (gold record) at the Estonian Music Awards for the single "O Si Nene". That year, it was also named band of the year and album of the year.

Discography

Albums
 I (1997)
 II Level (1997)
 Contact (1998)
 Freakshow (1998)
 Space Invasion (1998)
 Millennium: The Best Of Caater (1999)
 Connected (2000)
 King Size (2001)
 Club Space (2002)
 The Queen of Night (with Trinity) (2003)

Singles

References

Estonian pop music groups
Estonian Eurodance groups
Musical groups established in 1996